Earl Cooley (March 27, 1880 – May 6, 1940) was the 21st Lieutenant Governor of Colorado, serving from 1921 to 1923 under Oliver Henry Shoup.

He was born in Richmond, Illinois on March 27, 1880. He was married and had one child. He served in World War I in the 2nd Colorado Infantry. He had no public political office until he was elected to the office of Lieutenant Governor of Colorado. On February 17, 1922, while acting as governor, he pardoned a man whom he had defended on the charge of horse-stealing in 1907.  After his term as Lieutenant Governor of Colorado he served as a member of State board and Land Commissioners from 1923 to 1927. He died on May 6, 1940.

References

http://www.colorado.gov/dpa/doit/archives/offic/ltgov.html#Cooley

Lieutenant Governors of Colorado
1880 births
1940 deaths
People from Richmond, Illinois
Colorado Republicans
20th-century American politicians